Roberto Carlos Cortés Restrepo (born 20 June 1977) is a Colombian former footballer who previously played as a defender for Independiente Medellín.

Cortés played most of his career to date with Independiente Medellín where he was part of the Championship winning team in 2002-II.

Cortés played 25 times for the Colombia national team between 1999 and 2003. His most famous achievement was helping them to win their first ever Copa América in 2001.

Honours
Independiente Medellín
Categoría Primera A: 2002-II

Colombia
Copa América: 2001
CONCACAF Gold Cup runner-up: 2000

References

External links

1977 births
Living people
Colombian footballers
Association football forwards
Colombian expatriate footballers
Colombia international footballers
1999 Copa América players
2000 CONCACAF Gold Cup players
2001 Copa América players
Categoría Primera A players
Deportivo Cali footballers
Once Caldas footballers
Club Libertad footballers
Expatriate footballers in Paraguay
Independiente Medellín footballers
Millonarios F.C. players
Atlético Junior footballers
Footballers from Medellín
Club Atlético Zacatepec players
Copa América-winning players